Prico Nakitende (born 29 July 1996) is a Ugandan women's cricketer. 
In July 2018, she was named in Uganda's squad for the 2018 ICC Women's World Twenty20 Qualifier tournament.
She made her Women's Twenty20 International (WT20I) debut for the Uganda against Ireland  in the World Twenty20 Qualifier on 10 July 2018.

References

External links
 

1996 births
Living people
Ugandan women cricketers
Uganda women Twenty20 International cricketers